The 13th congressional district of Pennsylvania is a congressional district in the U.S. state of Pennsylvania. The district contains all of Adams, Bedford, Blair, Cambria, Franklin, Fulton, Huntingdon, Juniata, Mifflin, and Perry counties. It also includes slivers of Cumberland and Somerset counties. Republican John Joyce has represented the district since 2019.

Prior to February 2018, the district was located in southeastern Pennsylvania, covering eastern Montgomery County and Northeast Philadelphia. The district traditionally included most of Montgomery County, but was redrawn in 2002 to include part of Philadelphia, and altered again in 2012. The Supreme Court of Pennsylvania redrew the district in February 2018 after ruling the previous map unconstitutional. The old 13th district became the 4th district, and what was the ninth district in the southwest part of the state was modified and redesignated the 13th district, for the 2018 elections and representation thereafter.

The previously drawn district had long been a Republican stronghold, like many suburban districts in the Northeast. However, the brand of Republicanism in southeastern Pennsylvania was a moderate one, and the district, like the Philadelphia suburbs as a whole, became friendlier to Democrats during the 1990s as the national party veered to the right. The district had not voted Republican for President since 1988. In 1992, the district elected its first Democratic representative in 86 years, Marjorie Margolies-Mezvinsky. She was defeated in 1994 by Republican Jon D. Fox, but Joe Hoeffel regained the seat for the Democrats in 1998. It was in Democratic hands afterward, becoming even more Democratic after being pushed into Philadelphia after the 2000 census. In 2018, it was redistricted again by court order, becoming overwhelmingly Republican.

Demographics
As of the census of 2000, there were 647,435 people, 250,845 households, and 169,848 families residing in the district. The racial makeup of the district was 87.16% White, 6.05% Black or African American, 0.14% Native American, 4.05% Asian, 0.00% Pacific Islander, 1.32% from other races, and 1.24% from two or more races. 3.06% of the population were Hispanic or Latino of any race.

There were 250,845 households, out of which 30.4% had children under the age of 18 living with them, 53.3% were married couples living together, 10.8% had a female householder with no husband present, and 32.3% were non-families. 27.9% of all households were made up of individuals, and 12.6% had someone living alone who was 65 years of age or older. The average household size was 2.51, and the average family size was 3.09.

In the district, the population was spread out, with 23.5% under the age of 18, 7.1% from 18 to 24, 29.2% from 25 to 44, 22.9% from 45 to 64, and 17.3% who were 65 years of age or older. The median age was 39 years. For every 100 females there were 92.0 males. For every 100 females age 18 and over, there were 88.2 males.

The median income for a household in the district was $49,319, and the median income for a family was $61,108. Males had a median income of $36,441 versus $23,719 for females. The per capita income for the district was $25,053. About 5.1% of families and 7.1% of the population were below the poverty line, including 6.8% of those under age 18 and 8.5% of those age 65 or over.

List of members representing the district

Recent election results

Historical district boundaries

See also

List of United States congressional districts
Pennsylvania's congressional districts

References

 Congressional Biographical Directory of the United States 1774–present

External links
 Congressional redistricting in Pennsylvania

13
Constituencies established in 1813
1813 establishments in Pennsylvania